Ryan Hampshire (born 29 December 1994) is an English professional rugby league footballer who plays as a  or  for Wigan Warriors in the Betfred Super League.

He has previously played for the Wigan Warriors (Heritage № 1048) in the Super League, and on loan from Wigan at Workington Town in the Kingstone Press Championship and the Castleford Tigers (Heritage № 965) in the top flight. Hampshire has also played for the Leigh Centurions and finally Wakefield in the Super League.

Background
Hampshire was born in Wakefield, West Yorkshire, England.

Nicknamed "Rocky", he grew up supporting the Wakefield Trinity and played at the Normanton Knights as a junior.

Career
In December 2017 he signed with Wakefield Trinity for the 2018 season.

References

External links
Wakefield Trinity profile
Leigh Centurions profile
Castleford Tigers profile
SL profile

1994 births
Living people
Castleford Tigers players
English rugby league players
Leigh Leopards players
Rugby league fullbacks
Rugby league players from Wakefield
Wakefield Trinity players
Wigan Warriors players
Workington Town players